Lozovo is a municipality in eastern North Macedonia. Lozovo is also the name of the village where the municipal seat is found. Lozovo Municipality is part of the Vardar Statistical Region.

Geography
The municipality borders Sveti Nikole Municipality to the north, Štip Municipality to the east, Veles Municipality to the west and Gradsko Municipality to the south.

Demographics
According to the 2021 Macedonian census, Lozovo Municipality has 2,264 residents. Ethnic groups in the municipality:

Inhabited places

The number of the inhabited places in the municipality is 11.

References

External links
 Official website

 
Vardar Statistical Region
Municipalities of North Macedonia